Pelageya Andreyevna Rayko (nee Soldatova; ; 5 May 1928 - 15 January 2004) was a Ukrainian naïve painter who started painting her property at the age of 69. Her home is a national cultural monument of Ukraine.

Biography 

Rayko was born 5 May 1928 in Oleshky. Rayko had three sisters. She was deported to Germany but later returned to Ukraine before marrying Nikolay Alekseyevich Rayko in 1950 at the age of 22. They survived by growing their own fruits and vegetables and doing seasonal work on a kolkhoz. They had a daughter, Elena in 1951. Their son, Sergey was born in 1953. The family built a house on 74 Nyzhnia Street, Oleshky near the Chaika and Konka rivers in 1954.

Her husband and son abused alcohol. Her son was imprisoned for three years after he nearly destroyed the family home and sold stolen items including the electrical wiring. After his release, he stabbed his mother with a knife. In 1994, Elena died in a car accident. Rayko's husband died in 1995. In 1997, Sergey was sent to a refuge colony. He died in 2002 from cirrhosis.

In the autumn of 1998, she began painting her home as a method to process her family hardships. She used her  monthly pension to buy paint and brushes. She eventually painted the entire property. Her home became a local tourist attraction. In 2003, the Kherson Centre Totem creative group planned to publish an album of Rayko's works. She died on 15 January 2004. 

Her house is protected by a federal cultural heritage law. It is considered a national cultural monument of Ukraine. 

Inspired by Rayko's paintings during the 2022 Russian invasion of Ukraine, pro-Ukrainian activists in Russian-occupied Kherson used a dove as a symbol of cultural resistance.

References

External links

20th-century Ukrainian women artists
21st-century Ukrainian women artists
Naïve painters
People from Kherson Oblast
1928 births
2004 deaths
Ukrainian women painters
20th-century Ukrainian painters
21st-century Ukrainian painters